Hawke is a 2010 television drama film produced by The Film Company for Network Ten. The film premiered on 18 July 2010.

Premise
The telemovie chronicles the life of former Australian Prime Minister Bob Hawke. It centres around the build up to his election in 1983, the situations he faced during his time as Prime Minister, and the 1991 leadership contests with his Treasurer Paul Keating, the latter of whom, won. The film begins and ends with this event, but proceeds to show the rest of Hawke's life through flashbacks.

Cast
 Richard Roxburgh as Bob Hawke
 Rachael Blake as Hazel Hawke
 Asher Keddie as Blanche d'Alpuget
 Felix Williamson as Paul Keating
 Sacha Horler as Jean Sinclair

Production
Hawke was first announced on 19 July 2009 by Network Ten with Richard Roxburgh said to play Bob Hawke. A scene was filmed on 25 August 2009 at Dallas Brooks Hall, East Melbourne. Roxburgh reprised his role as Hawke in the 2020 episode "Terra Nullius" of the Netflix series The Crown.

Awards
Australian Film Institute Television Awards
 Best Guest or Supporting Actress in Television Drama – Sacha Horler (2010)
 Best Guest or Supporting Actress in Television Drama – Asher Keddie (2010)

References

External links 
 

Australian television films
Australian biographical films
Biographical films about prime ministers
Bob Hawke
Cultural depictions of Australian men
Films shot in Australia
Films set in the Australian Capital Territory
2010 drama films
2010 films
2010 television films
2010s English-language films